Michael Gerard Duca (born June 5, 1952) is an American prelate of the Roman Catholic Church who has been serving as bishop of the Diocese of Baton Rouge in Louisiana since his installation on August 24, 2018.  He previously served as the bishop of the Diocese of Shreveport in Louisiana from 2008 to 2018.

Biography

Early life 
Michael Duca was born on June 5, 1952, in Dallas, Texas.  He attended elementary and secondary school in Dallas and graduated from Bishop Lynch High School in 1970. He attended Holy Trinity Seminary in Irving, Texas, from 1970 to 1978, receiving a Bachelor of Psychology degree.  He also obtained a Master of Divinity degree in theology from the University of Dallas.

Priesthood 
Duca was ordained a priest by Bishop Thomas Tschoepe for the Diocese of Dallas on April 29, 1978, in Dallas. He attended the Pontifical University of St. Thomas Aquinas  in Rome, training as a canonist.  He served his diocese as a vocations director and as chaplain at Southern Methodist University in Dallas, both from 1985 to 1992. Before his appointment as bishop, Duca served as rector of Holy Trinity Seminary.

Bishop of Shreveport

Duca was appointed as bishop of the Diocese of Shreveport by Pope Benedict XVI on April 1 2008. He was consecrated by Archbishop Alfred Hughes on May 19, 2008, at the Shreveport Convention Center, with approximately 3,000 people in attendance. Duca was one of the regular panelists on the American Religious Townhall television program.

Bishop of Baton Rouge
Duca was appointed on June 26, 2018, by Pope Francis as the sixth bishop of the diocese of Baton Rouge, succeeding Bishop Robert Muench, who retired.  Duca was installed by Archbishop Hughes on August 24, 2018.

See also

 Catholic Church hierarchy
 Catholic Church in the United States
 Historical list of the Catholic bishops of the United States
 List of Catholic bishops of the United States
 Lists of patriarchs, archbishops, and bishops

References

External links

Roman Catholic Diocese of Baton Rouge Official Site

Episcopal succession

 

Living people
1952 births
People from Shreveport, Louisiana
Pontifical University of Saint Thomas Aquinas alumni
University of Dallas alumni
Catholics from Louisiana
21st-century Roman Catholic bishops in the United States